General elections were held in Thailand on 26 January 1975. The result was a victory for the new Democrat Party, which won 72 of the 269 seats. Voter turnout was 47.2%.

Results

References

Elections in Thailand
Thailand
General election
Election and referendum articles with incomplete results
General election